Haustrum lacunosum is a species of sea snail, a marine gastropod mollusk in the family Muricidae, the murex snails or rock snails.

Description
The length of the shell varies between 20 mm and 53 mm.

Distribution
This marine species occurs off New Zealand.

References

 Valenciennes, A. (1846). Atlas de Zoologie. Mollusques. In: A. du Petit-Thouars, Voyage autour du monde sur la frégate la Venus pendant les années 1836–1839. 4 vols.
 Finlay, H. J. (1928). The Recent Mollusca of the Chatham Islands. Transactions of the New Zealand Institute. 59: 232–286.
 Spencer, H.G., Marshall, B.A. & Willan, R.C. (2009). Checklist of New Zealand living Mollusca. pp. 196–219. in: Gordon, D.P. (ed.) New Zealand inventory of biodiversity. Volume one. Kingdom Animalia: Radiata, Lophotrochozoa, Deuterostomia. Canterbury University Press,

External links
 Bruguière J.G. (1789-1792). Encyclopédie méthodique ou par ordre de matières. Histoire naturelle des vers, volume 1. Paris: Pancoucke. Pp. i-xviii, 1-344
 Gray J.E. (1843). Catalogue of the species of Mollusca and their shells, which have hitherto been recorded as found at New Zealand, with the description of some lately discovered species. In: Dieffenbach, E.: Travels in New Zealand; with contributions to the geography, geology, botany, and natural history of that country, vol. 2: 228-265
 Hutton F.W. (1878). Révision des coquilles de la Nouvelle-Zélande et des Iles Chatham. Journal de Conchyliologie. 26: 5-57
 Beu A.G. (2004) Marine Mollusca of oxygen isotope stages of the last 2 million years in New Zealand. Part 1: Revised generic positions and recognition of warm-water and cool-water migrants. Journal of the Royal Society of New Zealand 34(2): 111-265
 Tan K. S. (2003) Phylogenetic analysis and taxonomy of some southern Australian and New Zealand Muricidae (Mollusca: Neogastropoda). Journal of Natural History 37(8): 911-1028

Muricidae
Gastropods described in 1789
Gastropods of New Zealand